Tianlong (lit. "heavenly dragon") is a flying dragon in Chinese mythology, a star in Chinese astrology, and a proper name.

Word
The term tianlong combines tian  "heaven" and long  "dragon". Since tian literally means "heaven; the heavens; sky" or figuratively "Heaven; God; gods", tianlong can denote "heavenly dragon; celestial dragon" or "holy dragon; divine dragon".

Tianlong  is homophonous with another name in Chinese folklore. Tianlong  "Heavenly Deaf" (with the character long  "deaf" combining the "ear radical"  and a long  phonetic element) and Diya  "Earthly Dumb" are legendary attendants to Wenchang Wang , the patron deity of literature.

Meanings
From originally denoting "heavenly dragon", Tianlong  semantically developed meanings as Buddhist "heavenly Nāgas" or "Devas and Nāgas", "centipede", and "proper names" of stars, people, and places.

Dragons
Among Chinese classic texts, tian "heaven" and long "dragon" were first used together in Zhou Dynasty (1122 BCE – 256 BCE) writings, but the word tianlong was not recorded until the Han Dynasty (207 BCE – 220 CE).

The ancient Yijing "Book of Changes" exemplifies using tian "heaven" and long "dragon" together. Qian  "The Creative", the first hexagram, says (tr. Wilhelm 1967:9), "Nine(it stands for a solid horizontal line that symbolizes the yang. Why nine is used is unclear.) in the fifth place means: Flying dragons in the heavens. It furthers one to see the great man("九五，飞龙在天，利见大人”)." The "Commentary on the Decision" (tr. Wilhelm 1967:371) explains, "Because the holy man is clear as to the end and the beginning, as to the way in which each of the six stages completes itself in its own time, he mounts on them toward heaven as though on six dragons(大明終始，六位時成。時乘六龍以御天)." And the "Commentary on the Images" (tr. Wilhelm 1967:371) says, "'Flying dragon in the heavens.' This shows the great man at work.(飛龍在天，大人造也。)"

The earliest usage of tianlong  "heavenly dragon", according to the Hanyu Da Cidian, is in the Xinxu  "New Prefaces" by Liu Xiang (79–8 BCE). It records a story (Yuan 2006:213) about Zigao, the Duke of Ye, who professed to love dragons. After he carved and painted dragon images throughout his house, a [] heavenly dragon [or fulong  in some editions] came to visit, but Ye was scared and ran away. 

The Fangyan  dictionary (12) by Yang Xiong (53 BCE – 18 CE) has another early usage of tian and long.

Asterisms
Tianlong Heavenly Dragon names both the Western constellation Draco and a star in the Chinese constellation Azure Dragon.

Tianlongza  "Heavenly Dragon Seat/Constellation" is the Chinese translation of Draco (from Latin "Dragon"), a constellation near the north celestial pole. The (1578 CE) Bencao Gangmu pharmacopeia's entry for long "dragon" describes (Read 1934:301) "a pearl under its chin", and Read notes, 
The constellation Draco has the appearance of guarding and encircling the northern pole which is the centre of the movement of the fixed stars. The Chinese paintings of the Dragon straining after a mystical "Pearl" undoubtedly relate to this relationship to the North Pole Star, though other explanations are given for this. (1934:306-7) 

Tianlong  "Heavenly Dragon" is the 3rd star in Fangxiu  "Room (Chinese constellation)" and corresponds to the Western constellation Scorpius. "Room" is the 4th of the Twenty-eight mansions in the Azure Dragon, which is one of the celestial Four Symbols. Wolfram Eberhard (1968:243) notes, "When the dragon star appeared in the sky it was customary to make a sacrifice supplicating for rain," and this springtime dragon festival occurs on the 2nd day of the 2nd month.

Centipede
The Bencao Gangmu entry for wugong  "centipede" lists tianlong  "heavenly dragon" as an alternate name. Li Shizhen's commentary reviews earlier Chinese commentators and texts. The Zhuangzi (2, tr. Mair 1994:20–21) says, "People eat meat, deer eat grass, [] giant centipedes savor snakes, hawks and crows relish mice." The Huainanzi (17, tr. Carr 1990:111) says, "The [] ascending snake can drift in the mist, yet it is endangered by the [] centipede." The Erya dictionary (15) defines jili  "thorns; puncture vine; bramble" as jieju  "centipede; cricket"; which Guo Pu's commentary says resembles a huang  "locust" with a large abdomen, long horns, and which eats snake brains. Although jieju can also mean xishuai  "cricket", Li concludes it means the snake-controlling wugong "centipede" that the Fangyan dictionary (11) also calls maxian  "horse/giant millipede" or juqu . According to Eberhard (1968:159), centipedes were snake predators, and "the enmity between snake and centipede occurs in many folktales and customs."

Buddhist usages
In Chinese Buddhist terminology, tianlong means either "heavenly Nāgas (dragon gods)" or "Devas (heavenly gods) and Nāgas".

First, tianlong  means "heavenly dragon/nāga" as the first of four nāga classes in Mahayana tradition (tr. Visser 1913:21-2).
 Heavenly Nāgas, who guard the Heavenly Palace and carry it so that it does not fall.
 Divine Nāgas, who benefit mankind by causing the clouds to rise and the rain to fall.
 Earthly Nāgas who drain off rivers (remove the obstructions) and open sluices (outlets).
 Nāgas who are lying hidden who guard the treasures of the "Cakravartin" and blesses mankind.

Hangzhou Tianlong  "Heavenly Dragon from Hangzhou" was a 9th-century Chan Buddhist master who enlightened Juzhi Yizhi by holding up one finger. The Blue Cliff Record (tr. Cleary 1977:123-8) calls this "Chu Ti's One-Finger Ch'an" kōan.
 
Second, tianlong  translates Sanskrit deva-nāga "Devas and Nāgas", the 2 highest categories of the Tianlong Babu  "8 kinds of beings that protect the Dharma". The lower 6 categories are yecha  "Yaksha; cannibalistic devils; nature spirits", gantapo  "Gandharva; half-ghost music masters", axiuluo  "Asura; evil and violent demigods", jialouluo  "Garuda; golden bird-like demons that eat dragons", jinnaluo  "Kinnara; half-human half-bird celestial music masters", and maholuluojia  "Mahoraga; earthly snake spirits".

Tianlong Babu  is also the title of a 1963 wuxia novel by Jin Yong, translated as English Demi-Gods and Semi-Devils. This Chinese title is further used by movies, television series, and a Massively multiplayer online role-playing game.

Proper names
Tianlong is a common name in Standard Chinese. Tianlongshan  "Heavenly Dragon Mountain", which is located near Taiyuan in Shanxi, is famous for the Tianlongshan Shiku Grottoes . The commercial name Tianlong "Heavenly Dragon" is used by companies, hotels, and gungfu schools.

A famous example is Tenryū-ji  "Heavenly Dragon Temple" in Kyoto, which is headquarters of the Tenryū-ji Branch of the Rinzai sect. Tenryū place names include a waterway (Tenryū River ), a city (Tenryū, Shizuoka ), and a village (Tenryū, Nagano ). Further examples include Imperial Japanese Navy names (Japanese cruiser Tenryū ), and personal names (Genichiro Tenryu , a wrestler).

References

Carr, Michael. 1990. "Chinese Dragon Names", Linguistics of the Tibeto-Burman Area 13.2:87–189.
Cleary, Thomas and J. C. Cleary. 1977. The Blue Cliff Record. Shambhala.
Eberhard, Wolfram. 1968. The Local Cultures of South and East China. E. J. Brill.
Mair, Victor H. 1990. Tao Te Ching: The Classic Book of Integrity and the Way, by Lao Tzu; an entirely new translation based on the recently discovered Ma-wang-tui manuscripts. Bantam Books.
Read, Bernard E. 1934. "Chinese Materia Medica VII; Dragons and Snakes," Peking Natural History Bulletin 8.4:279–362.
Visser, Marinus Willern de. 1913. The Dragon in China and Japan. J. Müller.
Wilhelm, Richard and Cary F. Baynes. 1967. The I Ching or Book of Changes. Bollingen Series XIX, Princeton University Press.
Yuan, Haiwang. 2006.  The Magic Lotus Lantern and Other Tales from the Han Chinese. Libraries Unlimited.

Chinese astrology
Chinese dragons

fr:Tianlong
ja:天竜
pl:Tianlong
zh:天龙